Homa Football Club (Hema) is an Iranian football club based in Tehran, Iran. They currently play in the Tehran Provincial Leagues.

The club has a long and rich history and has always been associated and owned by Iran's national airline carrier, Iran Air.

History

Pre-revolution success
Before the revolution, the team was known as Guard FC and then Homa .At the time, the team participated in the Takht Jamshid Cup. It was relatively successful, finishing third in 1974 and second in 1975. Homa FC finished third in 1975 President's Cup Football Tournament.

Season-by-season

The table below chronicles the achievements of Homa in various competitions since 1969.

Key

P = Played
W = Games won
D = Games drawn
L = Games lost
F = Goals for
A = Goals against
Pts = Points
Pos = Final position

TJC = Takht Jamshid Cup
TFL = Tehran Football League
SEC = Shahid Espandi Cup
TFL2 = Tehran Football League's 2nd Div.
Div 1 = Azadegan League
Div 2 = 2nd Division
Div 3 = 3rd Division

Managers

 Parviz Dehdari (1969–71)
 Hamid Alidoosti (2002)
 Farshad Pious (2007–08)
 Ebrahim Ghasempour (2008)
 Mohammad Tavanmand (2009)
 Asghar Ghollabdooz (2009)
 Mohammad Tavanaie (April 2009–)
 Ali Asghar Ghollabdouz (2008)
 Naeem Safari
 Sahameddin Mirfakhraie
 Fereydoun Asgarzadeh
 Ahmad Khodadad
 Bahman Foroutan
 Ahmad Behnam Aghdam(Barghamadi)

Players

 Nasser Nouraei
 Hamid Alidoosti
 Alireza Azizi
 Habib Khabiri
 Mehdi Khabiri
 Hassan Nayebagha
 Alireza Khorshidi
 Gholam Reza Nouraei
 Jafar Nouri
 Hossein Fadakar
 Ali Asghar Gollabdouz
 Mahmoud Sajjadi
 Mohammad Reza Ghorbani
 Ahmad Sanjari
 Sahameddin Mirfakhraei
 Naeim Safari
 Mohammad Tavanaei
 Shahrokh Motyie
 Aman Alah Naghdi
 Javad Ramzie
 Farshad karami
 Ahmad Sajjadi
 Ali Sajjadi
 Habib Alizadeh
 Sajad Sadeghi
 Hadi Naraghi
 Ahmad Behnam Aghdam (Barghamadi)
 Arian Zarrinfar

Football clubs in Iran
Association football clubs established in 1962
Sport in Tehran
1962 establishments in Iran
Yousef Mahdavi